Sagrada is a dice-drafting board game published by Floodgate Games.

Gameplay
The object of the game is for each player to construct a stained-glass window using dice on a private board having 20 spaces. The available double-sided window boards have a complexity rating ranging from 3 to 6, which also represents the number of favour tokens with which the player begins the game. A game lasts ten rounds.

Each turn, players choose from a pool of coloured dice available that turn in a snake draft. These are then placed on a player's private board representing a stained-glass window based on the restrictions specified on each slot of the board; for example, a slot may specify a number such as 2 or a colour such as red. Placement of the dice must also satisfy global placement rules. Players may also pay a fee to obtain rule-altering tool cards.

The first die must be placed on one of the edges of the window, and subsequently placed dice must be placed in a space adjacent to already-placed dice, either orthogonally or diagonally. Additionally, no die may be placed orthogonally adjacent to one having the same colour or the same number.

There are three global scoring cards used by all players, as well as a private scoring card for each player. A player scores points based on the three global scoring cards and their private scoring card. Points are deducted for each open space in the player's window, and awarded for each favour token possessed.

A game can take between 30 and 60 minutes, depending on the number of players.

Expansion
An expansion set called Passion was released in 2019. A digital version of the game published as an app by Dire Wolf Digital was released in 2020.

Reception
The game was runner-up for the categories "family game" and "artwork and presentation" of the 2017 Golden Geek Awards. It is described as a fast-paced game that is easy to learn and quick to play, and suitable for games with people who typically do not play board games.

A review by Owen Duffy for The Guardian stated that the game "benefits from some real variety", but that there is "almost no interaction between players".

Some members of BoardGameGeek, particularly those with colour blindness, have reported problems distinguishing between the dice, as colour is the only feature differentiating them. The app by Dire Wolf Digital provides a colour-blind  mode.

References

External links
Sagrada at Floodgate Games

Board games introduced in 2017
Dice games